Elachista madarella is a moth of the family Elachistidae. It is found in North America, where it has been recorded from Illinois, Indiana, Maine, Massachusetts, New Hampshire, New Jersey, New York, Ohio, Ontario and Pennsylvania.

The wingspan is 8–9 mm. The forewings are dark brown, with faint golden reflections. The base of the wing is silvery gray, with bluish reflections on the costa and golden reflections towards the dorsum. The hindwings are grayish brown. Adults have been recorded on wing from May to October.

The larvae feed on Carex pubescens, Carex cristata and Scirpus atrovirens. They mine the leaves of their host plant. They mine down an old leaf, then entering the leaf sheath of one a new inner basal leaf, then resuming upward towards the tip of the leaf. A single larva may mine several. The larvae are whitish or pale green. Larvae can be found in early spring. Pupation takes place on the upper side of a leaf over the midrib.

References

madarella
Moths described in 1860
Moths of North America